Vlčeves is a municipality and village in Tábor District in the South Bohemian Region of the Czech Republic. It has about 100 inhabitants.

Administrative parts
The village of Svatá Anna is an administrative part of Vlčeves.

References

Villages in Tábor District